The  Terrafirma Dyip season was the seventh season of the franchise in the Philippine Basketball Association (PBA).

Key dates
March 14: The PBA Season 46 draft was held at the TV5 Media Center in Mandaluyong.

Draft picks

Special draft

Regular draft

Roster

Philippine Cup

Eliminations

Standings

Game log

|-bgcolor=ffcccc
| 1
| July 17
| TNT
| L 79–86
| Aldrech Ramos (17)
| Adams, Laput (9)
| Ganuelas-Rosser, Tiongson (6)
| Ynares Sports Arena
| 0–1
|-bgcolor=ffcccc
| 2
| July 25
| NLEX
| L 94–108
| Joshua Munzon (24)
| Roosevelt Adams (11)
| Matt Ganuelas-Rosser (7)
| Ynares Sports Arena
| 0–2
|-bgcolor=ffcccc
| 3
| July 30
| Magnolia
| L 83–105
| Roosevelt Adams (25)
| Roosevelt Adams (11)
| Andreas Cahilig (3)
| Ynares Sports Arena
| 0–3

|-bgcolor=ffcccc
| 4
| August 1
| Rain or Shine
| L 77–83
| Juami Tiongson (20)
| Roosevelt Adams (16)
| Juami Tiongson (7)
| Ynares Sports Arena
| 0–4

|-bgcolor=ccffcc
| 5
| September 1
| San Miguel
| W 110–104 (OT)
| Juami Tiongson (28)
| Joseph Gabayni (15)
| Juami Tiongson (7)
| DHVSU Gym
| 1–4
|-bgcolor=ccffcc
| 6
| September 3
| Barangay Ginebra
| W 95–90
| Juami Tiongson (31)
| Eric Camson (13)
| Juami Tiongson (6)
| DHVSU Gym
| 2–4
|-bgcolor=ccffcc
| 7
| September 5
| Blackwater
| W 96–84
| Aldrech Ramos (17)
| Andreas Cahilig (11)
| Celda, Ganuelas-Rosser, McCarthy (4)
| DHVSU Gym
| 3–4
|-bgcolor=ffcccc
| 8
| September 9
| Phoenix
| L 84–96
| Aldrech Ramos (13)
| Joseph Gabayni (8)
| Matt Ganuelas-Rosser (5)
| DHVSU Gym
| 3–5
|-bgcolor=ffcccc
| 9
| September 11
| NorthPort
| L 84–104
| Adams, Ramos (14)
| Aldrech Ramos (8)
| Juami Tiongson (3)
| DHVSU Gym
| 3–6
|-bgcolor=ffcccc
| 10
| September 16
| Meralco
| L 83–95
| Aldrech Ramos (15)
| Joseph Gabayni (10)
| Batiller, Ganuelas-Rosser (4)
| DHVSU Gym
| 3–7
|-bgcolor=ccffcc
| 11
| September 19
| Alaska
| W 105–89
| Rashawn McCarthy (19)
| Joseph Gabayni (9)
| Reden Celda (7)
| DHVSU Gym
| 4–7

Governors' Cup

Eliminations

Standings

Game log

|-bgcolor=ffcccc
| 1
| December 9
| Phoenix
| L 100–103
| Antonio Hester (28)
| Antonio Hester (16)
| Alex Cabagnot (5)
| Ynares Sports Arena
| 0–1
|-bgcolor=ccffcc
| 2
| December 11
| Rain or Shine
| W 112–106 (OT)
| Antonio Hester (40)
| Antonio Hester (11)
| Alex Cabagnot (11)
| Ynares Sports Arena
| 1–1
|-bgcolor=ffcccc
| 3
| December 15
| Magnolia
| L 87–114
| Antonio Hester (21)
| Antonio Hester (8)
| Alex Cabagnot (9)
| Smart Araneta Coliseum
| 1–2
|-bgcolor=ffcccc
| 4
| December 18
| NLEX
| L 86–116
| Antonio Hester (27)
| Antonio Hester (11)
| Alex Cabagnot (5)
| Smart Araneta Coliseum
| 1–3
|-bgcolor=ffcccc
| 5
| December 26
| San Miguel
| L 88–100
| Juami Tiongson (21)
| Joseph Gabayni (8)
| JP Calvo (6)
| Smart Araneta Coliseum
| 1–4

|-bgcolor=ccffcc
| 6
| February 12, 2022
| Blackwater
| W 109–103
| Antonio Hester (41)
| Antonio Hester (13)
| JP Calvo (5)
| Smart Araneta Coliseum
| 2–4
|-bgcolor=ffcccc
| 7
| February 19, 2022
| Alaska
| L 97–102
| Antonio Hester (24)
| Antonio Hester (14)
| Antonio Hester (11)
| Smart Araneta Coliseum
| 2–5
|-bgcolor=ffcccc
| 8
| February 24, 2022
| Meralco
| L 95–107
| Antonio Hester (23)
| Antonio Hester (17)
| Ed Daquioag (3)
| Ynares Center
| 2–6
|-bgcolor=ffcccc
| 9
| February 27, 2022
| Barangay Ginebra
| L 107–112
| Juami Tiongson (27)
| Antonio Hester (11)
| Calvo, Munzon (7)
| Ynares Center3,561
| 2–7

|-bgcolor=ffcccc
| 10
| March 5, 2022
| NorthPort
| L 117–124
| Antonio Hester (40)
| Antonio Hester (18)
| Batiller, Calvo, Munzon, Ramos (2)
| Smart Araneta Coliseum
| 2–8
|-bgcolor=ffcccc
| 11
| March 9, 2022
| TNT
| L 107–127
| Antonio Hester (30)
| Antonio Hester (13)
| Joshua Munzon (6)
| Smart Araneta Coliseum
| 2–9

Transactions

Trades

Pre-season

Philippine Cup

Mid-season

Governors' Cup

Recruited imports

References

Terrafirma Dyip seasons
Terrafirma Dyip